Robert Joseph Manning (December 25, 1919 – September 28, 2012) was an American journalist. He worked as London Bureau Chief for Time from 1958 to 1961, Assistant Secretary of State for Public Affairs and editor of The Atlantic.

Works
Manning published an autobiography in 1992 entitled The Swamp Root Chronicle: Adventures in the Word Trade.

Career
Manning worked as the Sunday editor of The New York Herald Tribune and in 1966 became the 10th editor in chief of The Atlantic.

His work at The Atlantic landed him on the master list of Nixon political opponents.

Organizations
Manning was a member of the American Academy of Arts and Sciences.

He was also a member of the following clubs:
Tavern
St. Botolph (President from 1988 to 1990)
Century Association

Family
Manning was married to Margaret R. Manning, who died in 1984. Margaret was the book editor for The Boston Globe. In 1987, Manning married Theresa M. Slomkowski. He also had three sons, Richard, Brian, and Robert, along with four grandchildren.

References

1919 births
2012 deaths
American male journalists
The Atlantic (magazine) people
20th-century American journalists
United States Assistant Secretaries of State